Singhana is a city  in Dhar district in the Indian state of Madhya Pradesh. The Maa Harshiddhi Mandir is located here.

Geography
Singhana is located at an average elevation of 180 metres (590 feet).

Demographics
 India census, Singhana had a population of 13,460. Males constitute 52% of the population and females 48%. Singhana has an average literacy rate of 80%, lower than the national average of 59.5%: male literacy is 66%, and female literacy is 52%. In Singhana, 15% of the population is under 6 years of age.

References

Cities and towns in Dhar district